Martin Marčec (born 24 November 1992) is a Croatian handball player who plays for GRK Varaždin.

References 
 http://www.eurohandball.com/ech/20/men/2016/player/550431/MartinMarcec
 http://europeancup.eurohandball.com/ehfc/men/2016-17/player/550431/Martin+Marcec
 http://www.ehfcl.com/men/2016-17/player/550431/Martin+Marcec
 http://www.ehfcl.com/women/2015-16/player/550431/Martin+Marcec

1992 births
Living people
Croatian male handball players
Croatian expatriate sportspeople in North Macedonia
Croatian expatriate sportspeople in Germany
Expatriate handball players
Sportspeople from Varaždin